Hyles wilsoni, or Wilson's sphinx, is a species of moth of the family Sphingidae. It was described by Walter Rothschild in 1894. It is endemic to the island of Hawaii.

In wet districts the moth is freely on the wing at all hours of the day, visiting the flowers of Metrosideros, as well as those of cultivated plants. In drier localities it flies more freely at dusk.

Larvae have been recorded on Acacia koa, Bobea, Euphorbia, Metrosideros, Pelea and Straussia.

References

External links

Species info

Hyles (moth)
Endemic moths of Hawaii
Moths described in 1894
Taxa named by Walter Rothschild